The 2012 season is Sporting Cristal's 57th season in the Peruvian First Division, and also the club's 57th consecutive season in the top-flight of Peruvian football.

Sporting Cristal won their 16th Torneo Descentralizado title, after seven years of failed attempts. The team finished the season first in the aggregate table and were undefeated at home during the entire season.

Events
On February 12, 2012, Roberto Palacios played his last game in a Sporting Cristal jersey in a friendly match against San Martín in the Estadio Nacional.

Sporting Cristal were crowned champions of the 2012 Torneo Descentralizado on December 9, 2012 after defeating Real Garcilaso 1-0, at the Estadio Nacional.

Club

Coaching staff

Grounds

Players

Squad information

Transfers

In
.

Out
.

Competitions

Overall
This season Sporting Cristal will participate in the 2012 Torneo Descentralizado.

Torneo Descentralizado

Results summary

Results by round

First stage

Second Stage - Liguilla A

Playoff Finals
The Third Stage will be the finals (also known as the Play-off) of the 2012 season between the winners of each group of the Second Stage. As Sporting Cristal had the most points on the aggregate table, Sporting Cristal decided which leg they will play as the home team. They will also choose the venue of the third match in case both teams are tied on points after the second leg.

Squad statistics

Goal Scorers

Overall
{|class="wikitable" style="text-align: center;"
|-
!
!Total
!Home
!Away
|-
|align=left| Games played          || 46 || 23 || 23
|-
|align=left| Games won             || 27 || 17 || 10
|-
|align=left| Games drawn           || 11 || 6 || 5
|-
|align=left| Games lost            || 8 || 0 || 8
|-
|align=left| Biggest win           || 6–0 vs Cobresol || 6–0 vs Cobresol || 5–0 vs Sport Boys
|-
|align=left| Biggest loss          || 0–3 vs Real Garcilaso || - || 0–3 vs Real Garcilaso
|-
|align=left| Clean sheets          || 17 || 11 || 6
|-
|align=left| Goals scored          || 95 || 60 || 35
|-
|align=left| Goals conceded        || 44 || 16 || 28
|-

References

External links

2012
Sporting Cristal